MV Daggari is a ro-ro passenger and car ferry that operates on the Yell service, operated by SIC Ferries. She is also sister ship of MV Dagalien.

History
The Daggri was bought in 2003 along with MV Dagalien.

In 2003, the ferry which had been until now known only as B600/1 was named Daggri and launched.

Layout
The vessel has a big car deck and an entrance to the passenger lounge.  The passenger lounge ("saloon") has seats, tables, toilets, vending machines and a children's play area. There are two entrances to the passenger saloon.

Service
Along with sister ship, Dagalien, do the North Isles service operated by SIC Ferries. The service links Toft, Mainland of Shetland and the small settlement of Yell, Ulsta.

References

2003 ships
Transport in Shetland